Francisco 'Patxi' Ferreira Colmenero (born 22 May 1967) is a Spanish retired footballer who played as a central defender.

Club career
Ferreira was born in Saucelle, Province of Salamanca, and moved to the Bilbao area at a young age, making him eligible for to play for Athletic Bilbao under their signing policy. While a member of the youth system at Lezama, he won the Copa del Rey Juvenil in 1984.

Having not yet featured for the reserves, Ferreira made his La Liga debut on 9 September 1984 aged 17 years, 110 days, in a 0–3 away defeat against Sevilla FC – a club record as the youngest player in the competition. A strike by the professional players had forced the organizations to field their youngsters ahead of schedule, and he did not play another league game with the first team for two years; his record stood until Iker Muniain's debut, in August 2009.

During a steady professional career, Ferreira also represented Atlético Madrid, Sevilla, Valencia CF and Rayo Vallecano. He amassed more than 400 official appearances during his 17 years at senior level, 358 in La Liga alone, scoring 22 goals in the competition; career highlights included winning the Copa del Rey twice in a row with Atlético in the early 90s, and featuring in three group stage matches of the 1998–99 UEFA Champions League with Athletic. Having achieved three runner-up league finishes (1991, 1996 and 1998), his best individual season was with the latter in 1987–88 as the 20-year-old netted six times in 35 matches to help the Basques to fourth position.

Ferreira retired in 2001 at the age of 34, after a slow year with Rayo – the side from the Madrid outskirts finished in 14th position, and he appeared in less than one third of the league matches. He subsequently became a coach, working as assistant to Gaizka Garitano at SD Eibar; in June 2016, the pair joined Deportivo de La Coruña.

Almost exactly one year later, Ferreira returned to Bilbao Athletic alongside Garitano when the latter was appointed manager.

International career
Ferreira played twice for Spain in as many friendlies, the first being a 1–2 loss with Yugoslavia in Oviedo on 14 September 1988.

Honours

Club
Atlético Madrid
Copa del Rey: 1990–91, 1991–92

International
Spain U20
FIFA U-20 World Cup: Runner-up 1985

References

External links

1967 births
Living people
Sportspeople from the Province of Salamanca
Spanish footballers
Footballers from Castile and León
Association football defenders
La Liga players
Segunda División players
Bilbao Athletic footballers
Athletic Bilbao footballers
Atlético Madrid footballers
Sevilla FC players
Valencia CF players
Rayo Vallecano players
Spain youth international footballers
Spain under-21 international footballers
Spain international footballers
Basque Country international footballers
Athletic Bilbao non-playing staff